Im Dong-hyun (born 12 May 1986) is a South Korean archer. He competes for the South Korean national team and is a former world number one. He has 20/200 vision in his left eye and 20/100 vision in his right eye, meaning he needs to be 10 times closer to see objects clearly with his left eye, compared to someone with perfect vision.

Career

2004 Summer Olympics
At the 2004 Summer Olympics, Im set a world record in the 72 arrow men's individual ranking round, with a score of 687 (it was not recognized by the International Olympic Committee as an Olympic record, however, as the ranking round took place on 12 August, before the 2004 opening ceremony). He then won his first three elimination matches, advancing to the quarterfinals. In the quarterfinals, Im faced Hiroshi Yamamoto of Japan, losing to the eventual silver medalist 111–110 in the 12-arrow match. Im was placed 6th overall.

Im was also a member of Korea's gold medal men's archery team at the 2004 Summer Olympics.

2006 Asian Games
In 2006, he competed at the 2006 Asian Games and won two gold medals in the individual and South Korean team.

2008 Summer Olympics
At the 2008 Summer Olympics in Beijing, Im finished his ranking round with a total of 670 points, nine points behind leader Juan René Serrano. This made him the eighth seed for the final competition bracket in which he faced Ali Salem in the first round, beating the Qatari 108–103. In the second round Im was too strong for Butch Johnson (115–106), but in the third round another American, Vic Wunderle, eliminated him with 113–111.

Together with Lee Chang-hwan and Park Kyung-mo, he also took part in the team event. With his 670 score from the ranking round combined with the 676 of Park and the 669 of Lee the Koreans were in first position after the ranking round, which gave them a straight seeding into the quarter finals. With a score of 224–222 they were too strong for the Polish team and in the semi final they beat home nation China 221–218. In the final Italy came close, but South Korea took the title with 227–225.

2012 Summer Olympics
On 27 July 2012 at the 2012 Summer Olympics in London, he set a new world record score of 699 in the ranking round at Lord's Cricket Ground, beating his compatriot Kim Bub-min by one point. Although he was the top seed after the ranking round, he was eliminated in the round of 16, losing 7–1 to Rick van der Ven. Im did win a bronze medal with the South Korean team.

References

External links

 

1986 births
Asian Games medalists in archery
Archers at the 2004 Summer Olympics
Archers at the 2008 Summer Olympics
Archers at the 2012 Summer Olympics
Living people
Olympic archers of South Korea
Olympic gold medalists for South Korea
Olympic medalists in archery
South Korean male archers
Olympic bronze medalists for South Korea
Medalists at the 2012 Summer Olympics
Medalists at the 2008 Summer Olympics
Medalists at the 2004 Summer Olympics
Archers at the 2002 Asian Games
Archers at the 2006 Asian Games
Archers at the 2010 Asian Games
Archers at the 2018 Asian Games
World Archery Championships medalists
Asian Games gold medalists for South Korea
Asian Games bronze medalists for South Korea
Medalists at the 2002 Asian Games
Medalists at the 2006 Asian Games
Medalists at the 2010 Asian Games
Universiade medalists in archery
Universiade gold medalists for South Korea
Medalists at the 2005 Summer Universiade